Mo'jones is a band from Sittard, Netherlands. It is formed by the brothers Mo' (Jan van der Burgt) and Skinnie (Ron van der Burgt).  Their genre is a mix between funk, soul and pop

Discografie

Albums
 Mo'Jones (2000)
 Strong Man (2002)
 My World (2005)
 Middle Aged Angry Young Man (2007)

Singles
 Where the sun stopped shining (2001).
 Little love songs (2002)
 You cannot stop me (2002)
 Revolution (2003)
 How the wind blows (2003)
 Always the Same (2005)

External links
Mo'jones

Dutch musical groups
People from Sittard